Grumello is the name of two Italian towns:

 Grumello Cremonese ed Uniti in the province of Cremona
 Grumello del Monte in the province of Bergamo

Grumello may also be:
 Grumello (wine) a type of wine from Valtellina